Fockerby is a village in North Lincolnshire, England.

Fockerby is part of the Isle of Axholme and close to the border with the East Riding of Yorkshire. The village is in the civil parish of Garthorpe and Fockerby, and is contiguous with the village of Garthorpe to the north-east, with which it forms one community joined by a section of road which crosses the previous course of the River Don.

In 1872 Fockerby was in Yorkshire, divided from Garthorpe by the "Old Don".

By 1881 the village was a township in the parish of Adlingfleet in the West Riding of Yorkshire, and "on the west bank of the old Don River, which is now filled in and under cultivation". Lords of the manor and principal landowners were the Master and fellows of St Catharine's College, Cambridge. Occupations at the time included a land surveyor, a tailor, a miller, and three farmers, one of whom was a landowner who lived at the Hall and employed a farm bailiff. Fockerby population in 1871 was 88.

Fockerby was once served by Fockerby railway station the terminus of a branch line from Goole.

References

External links

Villages in the Borough of North Lincolnshire